George Weissbort (11 April 1928, Brussels, Belgium – 9 July 2013, Wye Valley) was a Belgian–born British artist. He lived and painted in Wye Valley, England. The critic Brian Sewell,  considering him an important exponent of  an earlier style at a time not widely receptive to it, described him as having "painted the right pictures at the wrong time".

Early development
George Weissbort was born in Brussels, Belgium but moved with his family to London as a child. Growing up in London, Weissbort's early associations and influences included the "experimental" artist and author Arthur Segal, whose conversion from abstract impressionism to realism initiated Weissbort's lifelong interest in optical realism. Weissbort attended the Central Saint Martins College of Art and Design in London in the 1940s where he was taught by Ruskin Spear and Rodrigo Moynihan. While there, he studied life drawing under Bernard Meninsky. His artistic œuvre includes life drawings, landscapes, still lifes, commissioned portraits and self-portraiture. Weissbort's art has been exhibited regularly at the Royal Academy and the Royal Academy of Portrait Painters.

Style
After initial experiments in the styles of Paul Cézanne and Henri Matisse, Weissbort re-focused his energies towards the study of the "Old Masters", developing an enduring interest in the work of such artists as Johannes Vermeer, Jean-Baptiste-Siméon Chardin, Diego Velázquez, Jean-Baptiste-Camille Corot, Andrea Mantegna and Titian. The great body of Weissbort's work, which spans seven decades to date, constitutes a sustained exploration of figurative representation. Applying many of the techniques and expertise employed by the Old Masters, Weissbort's work is concerned with the visual interpretation and representation of the natural world through a persistent and intense examination of shapes, patterns, compositional relationships, tonal nuances and the qualities of lines and edges. Thus, rejecting the tenets of contemporary conceptual art, Weissbort's work revives an older concern with observational skills and technical mastery. "To paint in the spirit of Poussin, Chardin, Piero, Vermeer and Holbein in the 21st century", Anthony Rudolf writes, "is, for this painter, a radical project of artistic reclaimation  and psychic renewal." 
  
There have been two retrospectives of Weissbort's work:

The Chambers Gallery, London, 2006
Denise Yapp Gallery of Contemporary Art, Monmouth, 2008.

A third retrospective is planned for October 2015:

Denise Yapp Gallery of Contemporary Art, Monmouth, 2015

References

External links
George Weissbort's official site
George Weissbort: A Retrospective, London Lantern 01/04/2006

Belgian artists
1928 births
2013 deaths